Chincoteague may refer to:

Geography in the United States
Chincoteague Bay, a bay on the coast of Maryland and Virginia
Chincoteague Channel, a channel in Virginia connecting Chincoteague Bay and Chincoteague Inlet
Chincoteague Inlet, an inlet on the coast of Virginia
Chincoteague, Virginia, a town in Virginia
Chincoteague National Wildlife Refuge, a wildlife refuge on the Virginia portion of Assateague Island

Ships
, the name of more than one United States Coast Guard ship
USS Chincoteague (AVP-24), a United States Navy seaplane tender in commission from 1943 to 1946

Other
Chincoteague (crater), impact crater in the Cebrenia quadrangle of Mars
Chincoteague Fire Department, a historic building in Chincoteague, Virginia
Chincoteague High School, a public high school in Accomack County, Virginia
Chincoteague Island Library, an historic building in Chincoteague, Virginia
Chincoteague Pony, breed of wild pony living on Assateague Island in Maryland and Virginia